The 2017–18 UIC Flames men's basketball team represented the University of Illinois at Chicago in the 2017–18 NCAA Division I men's basketball season. The Flames, led by third-year head coach Steve McClain, played their home games at the UIC Pavilion as members of the Horizon League. They finished the season 20–16, 12–6 in Horizon League play to finish in third place. They lost in the quarterfinals of the Horizon League tournament to Milwaukee. They were invited to the CollegeInsider.com Tournament where they defeated Saint Francis (PA), Austin Peay, and Liberty to advance to the championship game where they lost to Northern Colorado.

Previous season
The Flames finished the 2016–17 season 17–19, 7–11 in Horizon League play to finish in sixth place. They defeated Green Bay in the quarterfinals of the Horizon League tournament before losing to Milwaukee in the semifinals. They were invited to the College Basketball Invitational where they defeated Stony Brook and George Washington before losing in the semifinals to Coastal Carolina.

Departures

Incoming Transfers

Recruiting class of 2017

Roster

Schedule and results

|-
! colspan="9" style=| Exhibition

|-
! colspan="9" style=| Non-conference season

|-
!colspan=9 style=| Horizon League regular season

|-
!colspan=9 style=|Horizon League tournament

|-
!colspan=9 style=|CIT

References

UIC Flames
UIC Flames men's basketball seasons
UIC Flames men's basket
UIC Flames men's basket
UIC